The Black Death Award is an individual honor awarded to college football players at the United States Military Academy (better known as 'West Point') who distinguish themselves during a game. It is presented to players only in the case of "exceptional, near perfect play."

The award was first instituted by Army coach Jim Young in 1988. In 2007, Stan Brock, as the new head coach, reinstated the award. The award itself consists of a plaque featuring an Army Ranger-style knife and engraved with the honoree's name. According to Brock, it is given to players who go "above and beyond" and play "a near perfect game and have something to do with the outcome of the game for a victory."

Recent honorees

Sources: Scappaticci Earns Prized Black Death Award, Go Army Sports.com, 27 October 2008.

References

College football awards
Army Black Knights football
Awards established in 1988
1988 establishments in New York (state)